Park Kyung-su (born March 31, 1984) is the infielder of KT Wiz of the KBO League. He graduated Sungnam High School. He joined the LG Twins in 2003, and in 2014 he transferred to KT Wiz. He made his 100th home run in 2017 in a game against LG Twins.

In 2019, KBO's first second baseman hit double-digit home runs for the fifth consecutive year. He won the Korean Series Most Valuable Player Award for the 2021 Korean Series.

References

External links 

 PARK Kyung Su on koreabaseball

1984 births
South Korean baseball players
South Korean Buddhists
Living people